Charles Edward Harraway, Jr. (born September 21, 1944) is a former professional American football player, a running back in the National Football League (NFL) for eight seasons with the Cleveland Browns and Washington Redskins. He also played one season in the World Football League, with the champion Birmingham Americans in 1974.

Early years
Born in Oklahoma City, Oklahoma, Harraway's father was in the U.S. Army and he  attended the American high school in Baumholder, West Germany, and graduated from Monterey High School in California in 1962.

He played college football nearby at San Jose State University under head coaches Bob Titchenal and Harry Anderson and is a member of the Spartans' hall of fame.

Playing career

NFL
Harraway was selected in the 18th round of the 1966 NFL draft by the Cleveland Browns, the 273rd overall pick. He was also taken in the 14th round of the AFL draft by the Kansas City Chiefs.

He signed with the NFL and played three seasons in Cleveland under head coach Blanton Collier; the Browns won the Century Division in 1967 and 1968 and went to the playoffs. Harraway was the Browns' second-leading rusher in 1968, but he was waived in September 1969 and claimed by the Redskins, by Vince Lombardi in his only season as Washington head coach.

Harraway was paired in the backfield with Larry Brown, and the Redskins made the playoffs three consecutive seasons starting in 1971 under head coach George Allen, including the NFC title in 1972 and a berth in Super Bowl VII.

WFL
Harraway played out his option in Washington in 1973 and signed for a significant salary increase with the Birmingham Americans of the World Football League in 1974, one of the few NFL starters to jump in the league's first season. The Americans won the first World Bowl by a point in early December, but were less successful financially and folded in March 1975.

His NFL rights were traded by Washington to the Miami Dolphins for veteran tight end Marv Fleming in 1975; Harraway did not report, Fleming was waived in September, and both retired.

After football
In 2012, Harraway resided in Sarasota, Florida, and showed early signs of Alzheimer's disease.

Video
You Tube - Harraway highlight film - NFL Films

References

External links

 
WFL players – Charley Harraway

1944 births
Living people
Sportspeople from Oklahoma City
American football running backs
Birmingham Americans players
Cleveland Browns players
Washington Redskins players
San Jose State Spartans football players
Players of American football from Oklahoma
People from Sarasota, Florida